Hjalmar Frisk (4 August 1900, in Gothenburg – 1 August 1984, in Gothenburg) was a Swedish linguist and etymologist in Indo-European studies. He was also rector of the University of Göteborg from 1951 to 1966.

Early on, he became interested in Indo-European studies. Thus, as early as 1927, he published a translation of the historical account The Periplus of the Erythraean Sea, written in Greek under the title  Περίπλους τῆς Ἐρυθρᾶς θαλάσσης.

His most noted work was the three-volume Griechisches etymologisches Wörterbuch (Greek Etymological Dictionary) written between 1954 and 1972 and published in Heidelberg, Germany.

In 1968, he became a member of the Royal Swedish Academy of Sciences.

Works
 Griechisches Etymologisches Wörterbuch (in German). 3 volumes. Heidelberg. 1954–1972 (sometimes cited as 1960–1970).

References

Linguists from Sweden
Scholars of Ancient Greek
Linguists of Indo-European languages
Etymologists
Academic staff of the University of Gothenburg
Rectors of the University of Gothenburg
1900 births
1984 deaths
Members of the Royal Swedish Academy of Sciences
20th-century linguists